Tulantepec de Lugo Guerrero is one of the 84 municipalities of Hidalgo, in central-eastern Mexico. The municipality covers an area of 89.9 km².

As of 2005, the municipality had a total population of 29,246.

References

Municipalities of Hidalgo (state)